Cliffwood Hall, formerly Clifton Town Hall, is a historic municipal and social meeting hall at 15 Rebel Hill Road in Clifton, Maine.  Built in 1892, it was for nearly 90 years the town's town hall, and one of its principal social meeting venues.  It is now home to the Clifton Historical Society's museum collection and is known as the Clifton Town Hall Museum. The Society also operates the Harold Allan Schoolhouse.

The building was listed on the National Register of Historic Places in 2008.

Description and history
Cliffwood Hall is located on the southwest side of Rebel Hill Road (Maine State Route 180), a short way south of its junction with Maine State Route 9.  It stands next to the Harold Allan Schoolhouse, also owned by the local historical society.  The hall is a two-story wood frame structure, with a gabled roof, clapboard siding, granite foundation, and modest Italianate styling. The front facade is symmetrical, with a central double door sheltered by a bracketed shelf, and single sash windows on either side.  Above the doors are a pair of tall sash windows, flanked on the side bays by single tall windows, and there are a pair of normal-height sash windows in the attic level.  The windows are all topped by projecting cornices.  The downstairs of the interior has an entry vestibule, kitchen, and main hall, the latter now housing museum exhibits that include the old town hearse.  The upstairs of the hall is unfinished except for its pine floor.

The hall was built in 1892 by a group of local residents as a venue for social and cultural events.  It was purchased in 1899 by the town, and was used until 1899 as its town hall, housing town offices and hosting town meetings and a polling place.  The building was turned over to the Clifton Historical Society in 1999, and has house its museum there since then.

See also
National Register of Historic Places listings in Penobscot County, Maine

References

City and town halls on the National Register of Historic Places in Maine
Victorian architecture in Maine
Buildings and structures completed in 1892
Buildings and structures in Penobscot County, Maine
Town halls in Maine
Museums in Penobscot County, Maine
History museums in Maine
National Register of Historic Places in Penobscot County, Maine